Puurs-Sint-Amands is a municipality in the Belgian province of Antwerp that arose on 1 January 2019 from the merging of the municipalities of Puurs and Sint-Amands.

The merged municipality has an area of 48.99 km2 and has a population of 26,208 people as of 2021. Puurs-Sint-Amands consists of the following deelgemeentes (sub-municipalities): Breendonk, Liezele, Lippelo, Puurs, Oppuurs, Ruisbroek, Sint-Amands.

Together with Bornem, the area forms a region known as Little Brabant.

Creation

The Flemish Government provides incentives for municipalities to voluntarily merge. The municipal councils of Puurs and Sint-Amands approved a merge in principle on 18 September 2017. Definitive approval occurred on 20 November 2017, which was ratified by Flemish decree of 4 May 2018 alongside several other merges, all to be effective per 1 January 2019.

As of 1 January 2018, the municipality of Puurs had a population of 17,452 and Sint-Amands a population of 8,480.

Government
The first elections for the new municipality were held during the regular local elections of 14 October 2018, electing a municipal council for the legislative period of 2019–2024. CD&V obtained a majority of seats in the municipal council (17 out of 29). Koen Van den Heuvel, who was mayor of Puurs until then, became mayor of Puurs-Sint-Amands.

Gallery

References

 
Municipalities of Antwerp Province
2019 establishments in Belgium